Count Your Blessings may refer to:

Films 
 Count Your Blessings (1959 film), a drama starring Deborah Kerr
 Count Your Blessings (1987 film), a Dutch film by Pieter Verhoeff

Literature
 Count Your Blessings (play), a 1951 comedy play by Ronald Jeans

Music 
 Count Your Blessings (Bring Me the Horizon album), 2006
 Count Your Blessings (compilation album), a 1994 Christmas compilation album
 "Count Your Blessings" (hymn), a Christian hymn by Johnson Oatman, Jr.
 "Count Your Blessings" (Richard Morgan & Edith Temple song), 1946
 "Count Your Blessings (Instead of Sheep)", a popular song written by Irving Berlin in 1954
"Count Your Blessings, Woman", a 1968 song by country artist Jan Howard